Stephen Thymbleby (died 1587), of St. Swithin's, Lincoln, was an English politician.

He was a Member (MP) of the Parliament of England for Boston in 1572 and Lincoln in 1584.

References

Year of birth missing
1587 deaths
People from Lincoln, England
English MPs 1572–1583
English MPs 1584–1585
Alumni of Queens' College, Cambridge